Dana Dattelbaum is an American physicist and scientist at Los Alamos National Laboratory. She leads NNSA’s Dynamic Materials Properties portfolio at LANL, which provides experimental data, platforms and diagnostics for materials behaviors relevant to nuclear weapons performance, ranging from plutonium to high explosives.

Dattelbaum is internationally recognized for her research on shock and detonation physics, the shock initiation of energetic materials, static to time-resolved spectroscopies, and studying materials at extreme conditions.

Education 
Dattelbaum completed her Bachelor of Science in chemistry in 1996 at James Madison University and participated in NSF-REU and departmental internships at the University. She completed an honors these on nitrogen ylide chemistry under Gary Crowther.  She received her Ph.D. from the University of North Carolina at Chapel Hill with Thomas J. Meyer in 2001.  Her work elucidated excited state electronic structures in Re, Ru, and Os polypyridyl complexes and she was the first to develop time-resolved near infrared spectroscopy using step-scan Fourier transform interferometry.

Research and career 
Dattelbaum is an R&D Scientist within the Dynamic Experiments (M) division at Los Alamos National Laboratory. She has over 175 publications (h-index of 31), and is Past-Chair of the American Physical Society’s Topical Group on Shock Compression of Condensed Matter. Recent awards and honors include E. O. Lawrence Award (2020), Los Alamos National Laboratory Fellow (2019), Laboratory Fellow’s Prize for Leadership (2016), Fellow of the American Physical Society (2014), over 7 DOE/NNSA Defense Program Awards of Excellence, 2016 New Mexico Technology Council Women In Technology Finalist, and a 2007 LANL Star award. She is the LANL representative for the Stockpile Stewardship Academic Alliance, a steering committee member for the Chicago-DOE Alliance Center (CDAC), LANL’s elector for NSF’s COMPRES consortium, and is a member of the editorial board of the Journal of the Dynamic Behavior of Materials.  She also serves on the Committee on Careers and Professional Development for the American Physical Society (2019-2021). Dattelbaum makes extensive use on X-ray Light Sources in her research. She pioneered work on Shock-dissipating fractal cubes based on Menger geometry.

Awards and recognition 
2014 Fellow, American Physical Society
2016 Fellow’s Prize for Leadership, Los Alamos National Laboratory
2019 Laboratory Fellow, Los Alamos National Laboratory
2020 Department of Energy Ernest Orlando Lawrence award

References 

Los Alamos National Laboratory personnel
Fellows of the American Physical Society
American physicists
American women physicists
Living people
James Madison University alumni
University of North Carolina at Chapel Hill alumni
Year of birth missing (living people)
21st-century American women